Under the Salt is a 2008  Mexican thriller film directed by Mario Muñoz. The film's music was composed by Federico Bonasso.

Cast
 Humberto Zurita
 Plutarco Haza
 Ricardo Polanco
 Moises Arizmendi
 Emilio Guerrero
 Blanca Guerra

References

External links
 

2008 films
2000s Spanish-language films
Mexican thriller films
Films set in Mexico
Films shot in Mexico
2000s thriller films
2000s Mexican films